Carpe Diem is the third studio album by noise metal band Will Haven, released in 2001 by Music For Nations and Revelation Records.

Track listing
 "S.H.R" – 1:08
 "Saga" – 4:10
 "Carpe Diem" – 3:46
 "BATS" – 7:26
 "Dressed in Night Clothes" – 3:38
 "Dolph Lundgren" – 3:20
 "Finest Our" – 4:45
 "Alpha Male" – 4:23
 "Miguel..." – 4:35
 "Moving to Montana..." – 8:57

Personnel
Band members
 Grady Avenell – vocals
 Jeff Irwin – guitar and piano
 Mike Martin – bass guitar
 Mitch Wheeler – drums

References

Will Haven albums
2001 albums
Music for Nations albums
Revelation Records albums